U-2 may refer to one of the following German submarines:

 , a unique submarine launched in 1908 that served in the First World War as a training submarine and was scrapped in 1919
 During the First World War, Germany also had these submarines with similar names:
 , a Type UB I submarine launched in 1915 and scrapped in 1919
 , a Type UC I submarine launched in 1915 and sunk on 30 June 1915
 , a Type IIA submarine that served in the Second World War and was sunk on 8 April 1944
, a Type 201 submarine of the Bundesmarine, launched in 1962
 , a Type 205 submarine of the Bundesmarine that was launched in 1966 and sold in 1993

U-2 or U-II may also refer to:
 , a U-1 class Austro-Hungarian Navy submarine

Submarines of Germany